Dundas Castle is a 15th-century castle, with substantial 19th-century additions by William Burn, in the Dalmeny parish of West Lothian, Scotland. The home of the Dundas family since the Middle Ages, it was sold in the late 19th century and is currently the residence of politician and businessman Sir Jack Stewart-Clark. The tower house and the adjoining Tudor-Gothic mansion are listed separately as Category A buildings, and the grounds are included in Inventory of Gardens and Designed Landscapes in Scotland.

History
The name Dundas comes from the Gaelic dùn deas, meaning 'south hill' or 'pretty hill'. In the 11th century, the lands of Dundas, along with other land in Lothian, were granted by King Malcolm Canmore to Gospatrick, the earl of Northumbria, who had come north to escape William the Conqueror. The lands of Dundas passed to his great-grandson Waldeve, who granted them to his kinsman Helias in a charter dating from around 1180. Helias took his surname from his lands, becoming the first of the Dundas family. The Dundases and their cadets would later come to own much of Mid and West Lothian.
  
In 1416, James Dundas obtained a licence from the Duke of Albany (then the effective ruler of Scotland) to build a keep. This keep was extended in 1436, making it into an L-plan. The Keep served both as a home in times of peace and a fortress in times of war. Regent Arran gave a tip to workmen building the "Place of Dundas" in July 1544. On 13 August 1553 in the great hall, James Dundas gave his infant daughters Elizabeth and Jane gifts of silver plate.

Oliver Cromwell is known to have stayed at Dundas Castle around the time of the Battle of Dunbar in 1650. A statue of him remains standing outside the Keep.

In 1818, James Dundas had the 17th century portion of the building pulled down and rebuilt in a Tudor-Gothic style by the renowned architect William Burn. Burn also designed many churches and this influence is visible throughout the building. Burn's designs for the main state rooms allow for huge windows that look out on to lawns and parkland outside.

The building and extensive gardens had cost so much to construct that the Dundases were forced to sell the castle and lands in 1875. The buyer was William Russell. Clark's son, John, took the double-barreled surname 'Stewart-Clark' in honour of his father, and he was made a Baronet in 1918.

During the Second World War, Dundas Castle served as the headquarters for protecting the Forth Bridge.
Since 1995, the castle's owner has been Sir Jack Stewart-Clark, the great-grandson of Stewart Clark. Sir Jack was a Member of the European Parliament between 1979 and 1999.

Facilities

By the time Sir Jack inherited the property from his mother in 1995, it had deteriorated substantially. He initially considered selling it, but instead chose to embark on a programme of restoration. The Keep, uninhabited for over 300 years, had its parapet rebuilt and its stonework restored, and it was installed with electricity, heating, toilets and a kitchen. The dry rot in the castle itself was removed, and the drawing room, library and dining room were redecorated. The castle is now a 5-star exclusive venue, often used for weddings.

In the grounds of the castle is a holiday cottage called the Boathouse, situated on the shore of Dundas Loch. It is a 4-star self-catering venue.

Dundas Castle is a member of Unique Venues of Edinburgh and Luxury Edinburgh

Film and TV location
Dundas Castle has been used as a backdrop in films The Little Vampire (2000), Summer Solstice (2005), and Book of Blood (2009). It has also been used for adverts for Arnold Clark and T4’s links between shows.

Gallery

References

External links

Castles in Edinburgh
Inventory of Gardens and Designed Landscapes
Category A listed buildings in Edinburgh
Country houses in Edinburgh
Listed castles in Scotland
Castle